Justice Martinez may refer to:

Alex J. Martinez (born 1951), associate justice of the Colorado Supreme Court 
Alicia Austria-Martinez (born 1940), associate justice of the Supreme Court of the Philippines
Joe L. Martínez (c. 1909–1998), associate justice of the New Mexico Supreme Court
Luis Estrella Martínez (born 1971), associate justice of the Supreme Court of Puerto Rico

See also
Judge Martinez (disambiguation)